Ben's Friends is an American non-profit organization that operates free, online patient support communities for people with rare diseases. It was founded in 2007 by Ben Munoz and Scott Orn  and was granted 501(c)(3) nonprofit status on February 9, 2014. It is headquartered in Austin, Texas.

Ben's Friends runs 30+ online communities, each focused on a specific rare disease or chronic illness. The mission of Ben's Friends is to ensure that patients living with rare diseases or chronic illnesses, as well as their caregivers, family, and friends, have a safe and supportive place to connect with others like them. Ben's Friends communities are managed by approximately 100 volunteer moderators, most of whom are patients themselves.
The organization was founded in 2007 by Ben Munoz and Scott Orn during Munoz's recovery from a rare brain aneurysm caused by an Arteriovenous malformation (AVM). In early 2008, Munoz and Orn started two more communities, Living With Ataxia and Living With Trigeminal Neuralgia. Ben's Friends has served over 50,000 members, with more than 100,000 online visitors to the communities each month.

A few of the larger Ben's Friends Communities:
AVM
Trigeminal Neuralgia
Ataxia International
Adrenoleukodystrophy (ALD)
Fibromyalgia
Brain Aneurysm

References

External links
Forbes: Community is the Best Medicine
Houston Chronicle: Med student starts website for patients with rare diseases
TechCrunch: Big Impact on a Small Budget
Harvard Business Review: Deliver Big Impact On a Small Budget
Kellogg Magazine: High Speed Social Impact
Lily Clinical Open Innovation: The Power of Community for Rare Disease Patients
Lily Clinical Open Innovation: Joining with Patients at the Center of Clinical Research

Patients' organizations